The Mapa Quinatzin is a 16th-century Nahua pictorial document, consisting of three sheets of amatl paper that depict the history of Acolhuacan.

See also
Aztec codices
Codex Xolotl

References

External links
 High Definition scans of the codex at the French National Library

 
Codices
Manuscripts by area
A
16th century in the Aztec civilization
16th century in Mexico
16th century in New Spain
Pictograms